Admiral Hipper may refer to:

 Franz von Hipper (1863–1932), German Admiral who served in World War I
 German cruiser Admiral Hipper, a German heavy cruiser named after the World War I admiral, launched in 1937 and served in World War II